Valckenier is a surname. Notable people with the surname include:

Adriaan Valckenier (1695–1751), Dutch accountant and Governor-General of the Dutch East Indies
Gillis Valckenier (1623–1680), Regent and Mayor of Amsterdam
Jan Valckenier Suringar (1864–1932), Dutch botanist

See also
Valkenier